The 1956 Middle Tennessee Blue Raiders football team represented the Middle Tennessee State College—now known as Middle Tennessee State University—as a member of the Ohio Valley Conference (OVC) during the 1956 NCAA College Division football season. Led by tenth-year head coach Charles M. Murphy, the Blue Raiders compiled a record an overall record of 7–3 with a mark of 5–0 in conference play, winning the OVC title. Middle Tennessee was invited to the Refrigerator Bowl, where they lost to Sam Houston State. The team's captains were T. Sweeney and Ben Hurt.

Schedule

References

Middle Tennessee
Middle Tennessee Blue Raiders football seasons
Ohio Valley Conference football champion seasons
Middle Tennessee Blue Raiders football